Shii Station (志井駅) is the name of two train stations in Japan:

Shii Station (JR Kyushu)
 Shii Station (Kitakyushu Monorail)